The 1969 American League Championship Series was the first ALCS held after Major League Baseball adopted the two-division format that season. It featured the Baltimore Orioles vs. the Minnesota Twins, with the Orioles winning the series 3–0 and advancing to the 1969 World Series, where they would lose to the New York Mets in five games.  The Orioles and Twins would meet again the following year, with similar results.

This was the first of three straight appearances in the ALCS for the Orioles.

Summary

Minnesota Twins vs. Baltimore Orioles

Game summaries

Game 1

In the opener, eventual 1969 Cy Young Award winner Mike Cuellar faced off against 20-game winner Jim Perry, who would finish 3rd in voting. Frank Robinson's home run in the fourth put the Orioles up 1–0 off of Perry, but the Twins tied the game in the fifth inning when Tony Oliva hit a leadoff double off of Cuellar, went to third on Robinson's error and scored on Bob Allison's sacrifice fly. Mark Belanger's home run in the bottom of the inning put the Orioles back in front 2–1, but Oliva's two-run home run in the seventh after a walk put the Twins up 3–2. In the ninth inning, Boog Powell tied the score with a home run over the right-field fence. Reliever Ron Perranoski, who worked in all three games, shut off Baltimore's offense at that point. Then, with two down in the 12th and Belanger on third, Paul Blair stepped to the plate. Acting on his own, he bunted toward third. Neither third baseman Harmon Killebrew nor catcher John Roseboro could make the play as Belanger sped across the plate with the winning run. Dick Hall, who pitched  of an inning, was the winner. Perranoski did not allow a ball to leave the infield in the 12th, but was the loser nonetheless.

Game 2

Game 2 pitted Dave McNally, winner of 15 games in a row during the season against Dave Boswell. Both pitchers pitched shutout baseball into the 10th inning, until Curt Motton's pinch-hit single in the bottom of the 11th, scored Boog Powell from second base for the only run of the game. Boswell was the losing pitcher with a line of  innings, with 7 hits allowed, 7 walks, and 4 strikeouts with the lone earned run of the game. McNally pitched an eleven-inning complete game shutout (the longest in MLB postseason history), struck out 11 Twins batters and yielded only three hits, none after the fourth inning.

Game 3

In a pivotal Game 3, the Twins sent veteran Bob Miller to the mound while the Orioles trotted out their young budding ace, future 3-time Cy Young winner Jim Palmer. The Twins struck first in the bottom of the first off of Palmer on Rich Reese's RBI single after a two-out double and intentional walk, but Elrod Hendricks's two-run double after a double and error put the Orioles up 2–1 in the second. Two outs later, Don Buford's RBI single made it 3–1 Orioles and knocked Miller out of the game after only  innings. Paul Blair's two-run double in the fourth off of Dick Woodson made it 5–1 Orioles. The Twins scored their last run of the series in the fifth when Harmon Killebrew doubled with two outs and scored on Reese's single. Frank Robinson's RBI single with two on off of Al Worthington made it 6–2 Orioles in the sixth. Blair's two-run home run in the eighth off of Dean Chance made it 8–2 Orioles. Next inning, Davey Johnson hit a leadoff single off of Chance, then scored on Hendricks's double off of Ron Perranoski while Hendricks himself scored on an error. Mark Belanger singled and scored on Blair's two-out double. Palmer pitched a scoreless ninth to finish the series.

This Monday game at Metropolitan Stadium forced the NFL's Minnesota Vikings to play their game against division rival Green Bay the previous day at the University of Minnesota's Memorial Stadium in Minneapolis.  It was the first NFL game played in a Big Ten stadium.  That same day, because the Atlanta Braves were hosting Game 2 of the NLCS, the Atlanta Falcons had to move their home game against the Baltimore Colts from Atlanta Stadium to Grant Field on the campus of Georgia Tech.

Composite box
1969 ALCS (3–0): Baltimore Orioles over Minnesota Twins

References

External links
1969 ALCS at Baseball-Reference

American League Championship Series
American League Championship Series
1960s in Baltimore
1960s in Minneapolis
American League Championship Series
American League Championship Series
Baltimore Orioles postseason
Minnesota Twins postseason
American League Championship Series